"Jealous Mind" is a song recorded by Alvin Stardust in 1973, written and produced by Peter Shelley, and released in 1973. "Jealous Mind" was Stardust's only number-one single in the UK Singles Chart, spending a single week at the top of the chart in March 1974.  The single was released on Magnet Records.

Charts

References

External links
 

1974 singles
Alvin Stardust songs
UK Singles Chart number-one singles
Irish Singles Chart number-one singles
Songs written by Peter Shelley
1974 songs
Magnet Records singles